Pamban Gurudasa Swamigal (Tamil: பாம்பன் குமரகுருதாச சுவாமிகள்), popularly known as Pamban Swamigal, was an Indian Tamil Saivite saint and poet. He was a devotee of the Tamil god Murugan and composed and wrote poems in his praise. His samadhi is located at Tiruvanmiyur, Chennai.

Early life and education 
Pamban Swamigal was born sometime between 1848 and 1850 to a Saivite family in the town of Rameswaram. The town was part of Ramnad district, currently known as Ramanathapuram district. He was named Appāvu but later became known as Pamban Swamigal as he had lived and left his family at Pamban Island. A psychic predicted that Appāvu would be great man of words and wisdom. In his school days, Appāvu was very good in his studies and other activities and ranked high in Tamil and English.

At the age of thirteen, on a Friday at sunrise Appāvu had a vision and was induced to write poems on Lord Kumāraguru, which he wrote immediately on a palm leaf in a facile pen in his coconut estate. He wrote one poem each day before his lunch for 100 days, ending each decad with his manasika guru's name Arunagiri Nāthar.

His experiences with Lord Muruga 
Since Pāmban Swāmi was interested in the holy life from the early days, his parents were keen to get him married soon in the year 1878. His wife's name was Kalimuthami; they had one son and two daughters. Even after marriage Pamban Swami lived like a saint, mostly doing poojais and prayers. After his father's death Pāmban Swāmi took over the family business. He won many legal cases related to his business by the grace of Lord Murugan.

One night Pāmban Swāmi's daughter was crying due to illness. Her mother requested Pamban Samy to give vibhuti to the crying child but Pāmban Samy refused to do so and informed his wife to pray to Lord Murugan for help and started his meditation to Lord Murugan. She did as she was told by Pāmban Sami. After sometime Pamban Sami saw the child was not crying and found her fast asleep. When Pāmban Sāmi asked the mother about the change she replied that after her prayer to Lord Murugan, a saintly figure came inside the house and applied vibhuti on the child and went away. From that moment on the child was cured. He felt that Lord Murugan himself came and helped him at their request.

Palani Incident 
One day a friend of Pamban Swami informed him that he was going to Palani, the sacred hill temple. Pamban Swami also wanted to go to Palani and left his family life without informing them. When his friend asked if he had permission from his god, Pamban Swami said 'Yes' and lied to his friend. On the same day Lord Palani Murugan appeared before him with a frowning face and said Did I ask you to come there? " If I want your presence at the hill I could have done it easily. There is no reason for you to lie. I will call you when the time comes. You may remain there without any attachments." Then He asked Pamban Swami to promise that he would not go to Palani without His permission.

To keep his word Pamban Swami never went to Palani till his last days. Pamban Swami also gave up the taste of lime, salt, and hot spices. He used to take plain rice with green dal and ghee. He used to take food only once a day before noon; if he missed the time he would take food the next day only.

Making of Shanmuga Kavacham  
In 1891 Pamban Swami wrote Shanmuga Kavacham, a powerful hymn of 30 verses composed for the benefit of Lord Murugan's devotees to protect them from illness of body and mind as well as from foes, wild beasts, poisonous creatures, demons, devils and biting insects. Several instances prove that this Shanmuga Kavacham verses effective in this respect. If you recite it with heart and soul to Lord Murugan, the results will be swift and miraculous.  The beauty of Shanmuga Kavacham's 30 verses is that it contains 12 verses' starting with Uyir (vowels) ezhuthukkal and 18 starting with consonants.  This makes easier for the devotees to memorize the 30 verses.

Making of Panchamirtha varnam  
Also in 1891 Pamban Swami composed Panchamrita Varnam. Lord Murugan Himself has said to an old lady in Tiruchendur that "I will be present physically wherever the song is sung on a pleasant note." If anyone does puja inside the heart by reciting this poem, it is equal to doing abhisekam and puja.

One time Pamban Swami was walking on a rough track and a thorn pricked and pierced into his foot. The terrible pain made Pamban Swami to shed tears and pray to God. On the same night Lord Murugan came in the dream of a cobbler in the next village and informed him to make and give a pair of slippers to Pamban Swami. When Pamban Swami was traveling to the village the next day the shoemaker came with the pair of slippers to Pamban Swami saying that in his dreams Lord Murugan came and had given instructions to make a pair of slippers for him. Pamban Swami was very much pleased and thanked Lord Murugan for his kindness to His devotees.

Pamban Swami was once very ill due to diarrhea. Due to this he fainted and fell down and upon seeing this his wife fainted too. Lord Murugan came to their house just then and tapped with a stick, made Pamban Swami's wife get up and said "Don't worry. He will be alright. Just smear vibhuti on his body and say 'I will never leave you'." But Pamban Swami's wife was afraid to touch vibhuti as it was her menstrual time. Lord Bala Murugan said to her, "There is no prohibition during emergency." She did as she was told. Immediately Pamban Swami was cured.

One day someone told Pamban Swami that a poet was writing a song of 100 verses that was incomplete for the last two months. Upon hearing this Pamban Swami decided that he would compose a song similar to that. So he started and finished 125 verses within an hour. To this day no poet or saint has duplicated such a feat. The poem is called Tiruvorumalai Komagan. The first verse of four lines consists of 64 words to each line with total 256 words. Pamban Swami composed the remaining 124 verses without adding any other words. He said with the divine guidance anything is possible.

Visit to Kumarakottam 
On his visit to Kanchipuram in Tamil Nadu, Pamban Swami had failed to visit Kumarakottam, the famous Murugan temple in the town. On his way back Lord Murugan appeared before him in the form of a 30-year-old man with a turban and asked if he had visited Kumarakottam where Kanda Puranam was composed by the temple priest Kanchiappa Sivachariyar. He took Pamban Swami near to the temple and vanished. After the pujas, Pamban Swami was very much delighted by the grace of Lord Kumaran. In the railway station the train was delayed due to some fault as though it was only waiting for Swami and then the train proceeded without delay.

In the year 1894 at Peerapan Valasai near Ramanad in Tamil Nadu, Pamban Swami was determined to get upadesam from Lord Kumara Palani Andi himself and from no one else. So he obtained permission from the government officer to dig a pit in the burial ground to the size of 3' x 3' x 3' covered with lock & key for the roof. Before starting meditation he asked his followers to have faith in God. Because this was a burial ground there were a lot of disturbing events that took place. Once a big demon tried to seize Pamban Swami, but by hurling his dandam the demon vanished. On the seventh night a voice commanded Pamban Swami to get up. Pamban Swami replied that unless Lord Palani Andi Himself comes he would not get up, even if he had to die. Once again the voice said, "Your Lord has come to see you. Open your eyes."

Pamban Swami was delighted to see Lord Murugan in the form of Palani Andi with a dandam in one hand and the other hand in chin mudra accompanied by two rishis. With a smiling countenance Palani Andi came forward and gave a "single utterance" (oru mozhi) upadesam in Pamban Swami's right ear. After that they turned back, walked towards the west and vanished. Without getting up on hearing that one word Pamban Swami was very much pleased and continued his meditation for 28 days without food, water or sleep.

On the 35th day once again a voice was heard and commanded him to "Come out of the pit." Once again Pamban Swami replied that only if it is by his Lord he would get out. The voice said "Yes it's me." At once Pamban Swami got out of the pit and saw Chitra Poornima full moon in the sky. He had a cloth of one piece cloth like Patanatar or an āndi.

Later his followers requested him to wear two pieces of white cloth one around the waist and the other over his shoulder. Pamban Swami was content to remain in silence but others wanted him to speak of his experience. Even today the oil lamp that Pamban Swami used in the pit is preserved in Ramanad town by Pamban Swami's followers.

In 1895 Pamban Swami took sannyasa and left Pamban village. One day Lord Murugan appeared in his dream and asked him to proceed to Madras. But he accepted the command of his Lord and proceeded to Madras by train.

Madras trip  
On his arrival at Egmore railway station in Madras a cartman came to Pamban Swami and requested Pamban Swami to sit in his cart. Without saying anything Pamban Swami sat in the jatka. The cartman took Pamban Swami to St. George Town to house number 41 Vaithiyanath Mudali Street. Pamban Swami got down from the jatka and in front of him an old lady Mrs. Bangaru Ammal came to Pamban Swami and told him that in a dream the previous night Lord Murugan had said that a saint would come to her house and that she should provide him with food and accommodation. And Pamban Swami accepted her invitation and stayed there for some time.

Making of Thagaralaya Rahasiyam  

In the year 1896 Pamban Swami went to Chidambaram and wrote an upanishad known as Thagaralaya Rahasiyam. Lord Guha lives in every heart in a tiny light form. Pamban Swami gives examples from the Vedas, agamas, upanishads, Tevaram, Tiruppukazh and other scriptural sources. Pamban Swami also wrote two books known as Tiropa and Paripuranat Būthan. In this book, Pamban Swami provides quotations from all the 108 upanishads. Pamban Swami is the only saint who has composed 50 poems on Lord Murugan in pure Tamil without any words from other language due to his love on Tamil. Pamban Swami once said that any one who speaks ill of Sanskrit or Tamil is his enemy. The two sacred language are like two eyes. You cannot have one and despise the other if you want full knowledge of the spiritual world.

On Pamban Swami's visit to Varanasi, he stayed at Kumāra Guruparar Mutt. Pamban Swami wrote that he was very happy to stay at this famous mutt. The head of the mutt once offered kavi cloth by taking away his white dress and requested Pamban Swami to wear it. Pamban Swami at first hesitated but upon reflection Pamban Swami took it as God's wish from that day to wear two-piece kavi dress.

Once on a Shasti Pūja when Pamban Swami was present, the devotees had cooked rice for one hundred. But the one rice pot kept giving rice enough to feed nearly 400 people. So much was the demand that the other foods like vegetables, sambar and rasam had to be prepared three times, but the cooked rice never got emptied. Such miracles were commonplace in the life of Pamban Swami.

While in Madras, Pamban Swami had a premonition of his mother's death and his elder son's death. Before the telegram came Pamban Swami gave instruction for no one to disturb him because he is a sannyāsi, a man without family or bindings.

Fracture cure  
In December 1923 Pamban Swami had an accident at Thumbu Chetty Street in Madras. Pamban Swami was run over by a jatka and his left ankle was broken. He was admitted to the General Hospital. The doctors who attended upon Pamban Swami's leg said it would have to be amputated.

Pamban Swami was only praying and said "Let them do what they want do." On hearing the news only Chinaswami Jothidar had extraordinary faith in Pamban Swami's poem Shanmuga Kavacham and started to recite it. Chinnaswamy Jothidar had a vision of the Vel entering Pamban Swami's broken ankle. Miraculously the leg was cured in the hospital. Even British doctors were astonished and described it as divine grace.

On the 11th day Pamban Swami saw two peacocks dance before him and also saw Lord Murugan in an infant form lying next to his bed. In remembering the day Pamban Swami told his followers of the Maha Tejo Mandal Sabhai to believe in Lord Murugan and to do Mayūravahana Sevana Vizhā without fail, which is still done annually at his temple in Thiruvanmiyur. Pamban Swami's life proves this- "Vēlum Mayilum Thunai" is a not just a saying; it really helps sincere devotees in need.

One day Pamban Swami called Chinaswami Jothidar to look for land in Tiruvanmiyur as his last days were near. Pamban Swami marked the floor corners with his leg all arrangements were made to for that portion of land to be purchased. On 30 May 1929 at 7:15 am Pamban Swami called his followers and advised them to believe in Lord Murugan. Then he took a deep breath, held it inside his stomach and entered samādhi state.

Pamban Swamigal was a believer one God that is Siva the Para Brahman and Subrahmanya is part of Siva and comes from Siva. He clarifies this in his book Subrahmanya Veyasam. Pamban Swami got the name "Kumara Guru Dāsa Swāmigal" because of his deep love for Palani Murugan. His Sanskrit teacher named him as Kumara Guru and also as Pāmban Swāmigal because Swami lived and left his family at Pāmban Island.

Pamban Swami's full name is Adhyaasrama Suddha Vaidheega Saiva Siddhantha Gnanabānu, which means Pamban Swami is full of sayasi. He was a sanyasi who followed the suddha advaita in the Vaideha way of Saiva Siddhanta in the Dāsa Marga.

In his lifetime Pamban Swami wrote 6,666 poems, 32 viyasams and 1000 names of Lord Murugan. By reading his Gnānamūrtham hymn one will benefit in both worlds. He composed poems on Lord Kumara in more than 130 different forms as per Tamil grammar. Pamban Swami always liked to do silent Akā Pūja rather than audible pūja.

Songs composed 
 Shanaṇmuga Kavacham
 Pañcāmirutha Vaṇṇam
 Kumarakurutāsa Svāmigaḷ Pādal - 1266
 Srīmath Kumāra Svāmiyam (Kumāra Nāyakaṉ Thiruviḷaiyādal) - 1192
 Thiruvalaṅkatṟiraṭṭu (Pala Santha Parimaḷam) - 1135
 Thiruppā (Tiṭpa Urai) - 1101
 Kāsiyātthirai (Vadanāṭṭu Yātthirai Aṉubavam) - 608
 Siṟu Nūṟṟiraṭṭu (Shaṇmuga Kavacham and other songs) - 258
 Sīvayātaṉā Viyāsam (Jeevakāruṇyam - Pulāl Maṟuppu) - 235
 Paripūraṇāṉantha Bōtham (Sivacūriya Prakāsam Urai) - 230
 Sekkar Vēḷ Semmāppu - 198
 Sekkar Vēḷ Iṟumāppu - 64
 Thakarālaya Ragasiyam (Sathāṉantha Sāhara Urai)- 117
 Kumaravēḷ Pathitṟu Patthanthāthi - 100
 Sēntaṉ Senthamiḻ (Pure Tamil Words)- 50
 Kumārastavam 44
 Theṉṉāṭṭu Thirutthala Dharisaṉam (Kaṭṭaḷai Kalitthuṟai) 35
 Patthu Pirapantham (Chittira Kavigaḷ) 30
 Aṉanthakkaḷippu 30
 Samāthāṉa Saṅgeetham 1
 Shanmuga Sahasra Nāmārcchaṉai 2

He wrote 6,666 hymns and 32 compositions to celebrate Lord Muruga.

References

External links 
 Pambanswamigal.org

1848 births
1929 deaths
Indian Shaivite religious leaders
People from Ramanathapuram district
Kaumaram